Richard Luke (17 May 1948 – 27 August 2014) was an Australian rules footballer who played with South Melbourne in the Victorian Football League (VFL).

Notes

External links 

2014 deaths
1948 births
Australian rules footballers from Victoria (Australia)
Sydney Swans players
Spotswood Football Club players